Interleukin-28 receptor is a type II cytokine receptor found largely in epithelial cells. It binds type 3 interferons, interleukin-28 A (Interferon lambda 1), Interleukin-28B (Interferon lambda 2), interleukin 29 (Interferon lambda 3) and interferon lambda 4. It consists of an α chain and shares a common β subunit with the interleukin-10 receptor. Binding to the interleukin-28 receptor, which is restricted to select cell types, is important for fighting infection. Binding of the type 3 interferons to the receptor results in activation of the JAK/STAT signaling pathway.

Structure 
The interleukin 28 receptor consists of an interleukin-28R alpha chain (IL-28RA) and another receptor, the beta subunit of the Interleukin-10 receptor (IL-10R2). IL-10R2 is part of the receptor for other cytokines such as IL-10, IL-22, IL-26, and IL-20. The IL-28Ra chain is a part of the cytokine receptor family 2. The IL-28Ra chain is important for recognition and ligand specificity, while the IL-10R2 is crucial in signaling.

Location 
While the type 1 interferon receptor is diversely distributed, the Interleukin-28 receptor expression is more restricted, particularly the IL28RA chain. The receptor is expressed largely in epithelial cells, specifically keratinocytes and melanocytes found in the epidermis.  The receptor is also highly expressed in cells of the lung, kidney, intestinal tract, liver, heart and prostate. Relatively high expression has also been documented in immune cells such as dendritic cells. Other immune cell types such as Natural killer cells, monocytes, T cells and B cells, though expressing significant amounts of the IL28RA mRNA, were unresponsive to type 3 interferons. Cells such as those in the central nervous system, uterus, bone marrow, testis and skeletal muscle have low mRNA levels and do not respond to the interferon lambdas.

Function 
On binding of a type 3 interferon to the IL-28RA the IL-10RB is recruited leading to the activation of  two tyrosine kinases, JAK1 and tyrosine kinase 2 (tyk2). As a result STAT-1 and STAT-2 are recruited and phosphorylated. These two transcription factors then combine with IRF9 to form a complex known as the interferon stimulated gene factor 3 complex (ISGF3). This enters the nucleus and binds to promoter regions, causing transcription of various genes called Interferon induced genes (ISGs) Researchers have also found that the binding of the type 3 interferons to their receptor also leads to phosphorylation of STAT-3, STAT-4, and STAT-5. In addition to the JAK/STAT pathway, other pathways such as the MAPK and PI3 kinase pathways have been discovered to be activated as a result of this ligand receptor binding.

When the type 3 cytokines bind to the interleukin-28 receptor it causes several cellular responses that aid the skin cells in fighting infection.  In binding to the receptor, interferon lambdas inhibit cell growth and the cell begins to produce cellular receptors that can sense infection as well as proteins to fight a viral infection. The interleukin-28 receptor, once a ligand is bound will activate a signaling pathway that causes an increase in MHC class 1 production. Once the type 3 interferons bind to their receptor, the resulting signaling cascade results in the production of IL-6, IL-8, and IL-10 by macrophages and monocytes. Naïve and memory T cells also respond by reducing production of IL-5 and IL-13 and increasing interferon gamma production. Signaling from the receptor also causes increased cytotoxicity in Natural killer cells and Cytotoxic T cells, increased T helper cell 1 responses and MHC class 1 expression on tumor cells.

Regulation 
Researchers have noted that IL-28RA gene expression is increased during stimulation by other interferons. There is also an increased expression of IL-28RA  on  the surface during maturation of monocytes to macrophages. While the signaling cascade induced by type 3 interferons binding to their receptor results in significant protection from infections, the response must be regulated to prevent uncontrolled inflammation and apoptosis. Mechanisms involved in regulation can include induction of suppressor of cytokine signaling proteins (SOCSs). There also exists a soluble splice variant of the receptor that can bind the type 3 interferons thus negatively regulating signaling.

Clinical significance 
Studies show that signaling of the interferon lambdas via the IL-28R reduces tumorigenicity of cancer cells and causes apoptosis.In addition, increasing expression of IL-28R increases the anticancer effects of interferon lambdas.  The signaling cascade from the receptor has also been seen to reduce proliferation on human cell lines such as the BON1 pancreatic neuroendocrine tumor cell lines.Signaling through the IL-28R also protects against viruses such as encephalomyocarditis virus and vesicular stomatitis virus as well as the hepatitis B virus in hepatocytes.

References

External links 
 

Type II cytokine receptors